Speyeria, commonly known as  greater fritillaries, is a genus of butterflies in the family Nymphalidae commonly found in North America, Europe, and Asia.
Some authors used to consider this taxon a subgenus of Argynnis, but it has been reestablished as a separate genus in 2017.

Species
The genus has 3 species in Eurasia (these were formerly known as genus Mesoacidalia, now a synonym of Speyeria):
Speyeria aglaja (Linnaeus, 1758) – Dark green fritillary
Speyeria alexandra (Ménétriés, 1832)
Speyeria clara (Blanchard, [1844])

and 16 species in North America:
Speyeria diana (Cramer, [1777]) – Diana fritillary
Speyeria cybele (Fabricius, 1775) – great spangled fritillary
Speyeria aphrodite (Fabricius, 1787) – Aphrodite fritillary 
Speyeria idalia (Drury, [1773]) – regal fritillary 
Speyeria nokomis (Edwards, 1862) – Nokomis fritillary 
Speyeria edwardsii (Reakirt, 1866) – Edward's fritillary
Speyeria coronis (Behr, 1864) – Coronis fritillary
Speyeria zerene (Boisduval, 1852) – zerene fritillary
Speyeria carolae (dos Passos & Grey, 1942) – Carole's fritillary
Speyeria callippe (Boisduval, 1852) – callippe fritillary
Speyeria egleis (Behr, 1863) – Egleis fritillary 
Speyeria adiaste (Edwards, 1864) – unsilvered fritillary or Adiaste fritillary 
Speyeria atlantis (Edwards, 1862) – Atlantis fritillary 
Speyeria hesperis (Edwards, 1864) – northwestern fritillary
Speyeria hydaspe (Boisduval, 1869) – Hydaspe fritillary 
Speyeria mormonia (Boisduval, 1869) – Mormon fritillary

References

Further reading
 Glassberg, Jeffrey (2001). Butterflies through Binoculars: The West.
 Guppy, Crispin S. and Shepard, Jon H. (2001). Butterflies of British Columbia.
 James, David G. and Nunnallee, David (2011). Life Histories of Cascadia Butterflies.
 Pelham, Jonathan (2008). Catalogue of the Butterflies of the United States and Canada.
 Pyle, Robert Michael (2002). The Butterflies of Cascadia.

External links
 Butterflies and Moths of North America
 Butterflies of America

 
Argynnini
Taxa named by Samuel Hubbard Scudder
Nymphalidae genera